Slavery in Cuba was a portion of the larger Atlantic Slave Trade that primarily supported Spanish plantation owners engaged in the sugarcane trade. It was practised on the island of Cuba from the 16th century until it was abolished by Spanish royal decree on October 7, 1886.

The first organized system of slavery in Cuba was introduced by the Spanish Empire, which attacked and enslaved the island's indigenous Taíno and Guanahatabey peoples on a grand scale. Cuba's original population was eventually almost destroyed completely, partly due to this lethal forced labor throughout the course of the 1500s. The remaining Taino intermixed with Europeans or African slaves and no full blooded Taino remained after the 1600s, though many Cubans today do have Taino DNA and are descendants of those intermixed Tainos.

Following the Taino genocide in which the Spanish bred out or killed majority of the native population, the Spanish were in need of new slaves to uphold their sugarcane production. They thus brought more than a million enslaved African people to Cuba. The African enslaved population grew to outnumber European Cubans, and a large proportion of Cubans today are descended from these enslaved peoples, perhaps as many as 65% of the population .

Cuba became one of the world's largest sugarcane producers after the Haitian Revolution and it continued to import enslaved Africans long after the practice was internationally outlawed. Cuba would not end its participation in the slave trade until 1867, nor abolish slave ownership until 1886. Due to growing pressure on the trade throughout the 19th century, it also imported more than 100,000 Chinese indentured workers to replace dwindling African labor.

History
By the 1550s, the Spanish had wiped out most of the indigenous population of Cuba, which up to that point had been their primary source of enslaved labor. Chattel slavery of people of African origin was thus introduced around this time in order to make up for the labor shortage.”  

They provided services to the garrisons of the Nueva España and Tierra Firme fleets, which arrived at the port annually. Throughout the 1500s and 1600s, enslaved people made up a large portion of the services sector of the city's economy and also held numerous skilled trade positions in Havana. European-Cuban historian José Martín Félix de Arrate y Acosta recalled in 1761 that “negros and pardos” were “very able and capable to apply themselves, becoming distinguished masters, not only in the lowest ones such as shoemakers, tailors, masons, and carpenters, but also in those which require more ability and genius, such as silversmith’s craft, sculpture, painting, and carving, as denoted by their marvelous works.”  Some enslaved Havanans worked under a market-based system in which the enslaved person had the responsibility of finding their own job and employer, and then giving over a portion of their earnings to their owner.

Enslaved peoples in Cuba did not begin to experience the harsh conditions of plantation agriculture until after the 1770s, once the international plantation economy had expanded into Western Cuba. In 1740 the Havana Company was formed to stimulate the sugar industry by encouraging slave importation into the colony, although it was an unsuccessful early attempt. But in 1762 the British Empire, led by the Earl of Albemarle, captured Havana during the Seven Years' War with Spain. During the year-long occupation of Havana and the surrounding regions, the British expanded the plantation system on the island and imported 4,000 enslaved people from their other possessions in the West Indies to populate the new plantations. These 4,000 enslaved formed nearly 10% of all enslaved people imported to the island during the previous 250 years. Spain regained control of the British-held regions of Cuba in 1763 by surrendering Florida to the British in exchange.

The British had also freed 90 enslaved people who had sided with them during the invasion, in recognition of their contribution to the Spanish defeat. Given their role in the Seven Years' War, Spanish colonial official Julián de Arriaga realized that enslaved people could become partisans of foreign nations which offered them freedom. He thus began to issue cartas de libertad and emancipated some two dozen enslaved people who had defended Havana against the British. The Spanish Crown increased the imports of enslaved people in order to ensure the loyalty of European-Cuban planters and to increase revenues from the lucrative sugar trade, as the crop was in high demand in Europe by this time.

In 1792 enslaved people of the French colony of Saint-Domingue began a revolution on the nearby island of Hispaniola. In 1803, ships carrying both white European and free people of color refugees arrived in Cuba from Saint-Domingue. Though all the passengers on board had been legally free under French law for years, and many of the mixed-race people had been born free, upon their arrival the Cubans classified those of even partial African descent as slaves. The white passengers were allowed entry into Cuba while African and mulatto passengers were restrained on the ships. Some of the white passengers had additionally claimed some of the Black passengers as slaves during the journey. The women of African descent and their children were particularly subject to being pressed into slavery.

The Haitians finally gained their independence in 1804. They declared the new Republic of Haiti, making it second Republic in the Western Hemisphere and the first founded by formerly enslaved people. Cuban slaveholders watched these events closely, but took comfort in thinking the rebellion was the result of the radical politics of the French Revolution, during which the French government had abolished slavery in the colonies before attempting to reintroduce it shortly afterwards. As the new freedmen set up small subsistence farms in Haiti, Cuba's planters gained much of the sugar market formerly held by Saint-Domingue's large plantations. As sugar expanded to dominate the economy in Cuba, planters greatly expanded their importation of enslaved people from Africa. As a result, “between 1791 to 1805, 91,211 slaves entered the island through Havana”.

In the early 19th century, the Cuban planters, who relied almost exclusively on foreign slave traders, closely followed debates on abolishing slavery in Britain and the newly-independent United States. In 1807, both Britain and the United States banned the Atlantic slave trade, with the British ban taking effect in 1807 and the American ban taking effect in 1808. Unlike in the rest of the Americas, the 19th century European-descended Cuban elite did not form an anti-colonial movement. They worried that such action would encourage enslaved Cubans to revolt. Cuban elites petitioned the Spanish Crown to create an independent Cuban slave-trading company, and smugglers continued to ship enslaved people to the island when they could evade British and American anti-slavery patrols around West Africa.

In March 1812, a series of revolts led by freedman José Antonio Aponte erupted in the plantations of Cuba. After the revolts were suppressed by the local militias armed by the government, hundreds of enslaved people were arrested, with many of the leaders being tried and executed.

By 1817, Britain and Spain were making a concerted effort to reform their diplomatic ties and negotiate the legal status of the Atlantic slave trade. An Anglo-Spanish treaty in 1817 formally gained Spanish agreement to immediately end the slave trade north of the Equator and expand enforcement against illegal slave ships. But, as recorded by legal trade documents of the era, 372,449 enslaved people were imported to Cuba before the slave trade legally ended, and at least 123,775 were imported between 1821 and 1853.

Even as the slave trade ceased in other parts of the Atlantic, the Cuban slave trade continued on until 1867. The ownership of human beings as chattel slaves remained legal in Cuba until 1880. The slave trade in Cuba would not systematically end until chattel Cuban slavery was abolished by Spanish royal decree in 1886, making it one of the last countries in the Western Hemisphere (preceding only Brazil) to formally abolish slavery.

Conditions of enslavement
Enslaved people who worked on sugar plantations and in sugar mills were often subject to the harshest of conditions. The field work was rigorous manual labor which they had to begin at an early age. The work days lasted close to 20 hours during harvest and processing, including cultivating and cutting the crops, hauling wagons, and processing sugarcane with dangerous machinery. Enslaved people were forced to reside in barracoons, where they were crammed in and locked in by a padlock at night, getting about three to four hours of sleep.  The conditions of the barracoons were highly unsanitary and extremely hot. Typically there was no ventilation; the only window was a small barred hole in the wall.

Enslaved people who misbehaved, underproduced, or disobeyed their masters were often placed in stocks in boiler houses, where they were abandoned for anywhere from a few days to as much as two to three months at a time. The wooden stocks were built in both standing and prostrate varieties, and women were subjected to this and other forms of torture even when pregnant. When subjected to whippings, pregnant women had to lay "face down over a scooped-out piece of round [earth] to protect their bellies." Some masters reportedly whipped pregnant women in the belly, often causing miscarriages. Enslaved Cubans developed herbal remedies to treat torture wounds where possible, applying “compresses of tobacco leaves, urine and salt" to lashing wounds in particular.

Under Spanish law in the sixteenth and seventeenth centuries, enslaved people had certain rights and were able to appeal to authorities to ensure the enforcement of these rights. These rights were influenced by the Siete Partidas code of Alfonso X the Wise, which regulated slavery in Castile. Some of these rights included the right to purchase freedom and access to Catholic sacraments, such as baptism and marriage. The purchase of freedom was often facilitated by a legal custom, coartación. Through coartación, enslaved people were able to come to agreements with their slaveholder on a price for their freedom and would pay for their manumission in installments. Enslaved people who created these agreements with their slaveholders were called coartados.

In 1789, the Spanish Crown led an effort to reform slavery, as the demand for enslaved labor in Cuba was growing. The Crown issued a decree, the Código Negro Español (Spanish Black Code), that specified food and clothing provisions, put limits on the number of work hours, limited punishments, required religious instruction, and protected marriages, forbidding the sale of young children away from their mothers. But planters often flouted the laws and protested against them. They considered the code a threat to their authority and an intrusion into their personal lives.

The slave owners did not protest against all the measures of the code, many of which, they argued, were already common practices. They objected to efforts to set limits on their ability to apply physical punishment. For instance, the Black Code limited lashings to 25 and required whipping "not to cause serious bruises or bleeding". The slaveholders thought that the enslaved Cubans would interpret these limits as weaknesses, ultimately leading to resistance. Another contested issue was the restriction of work hours "from sunrise to sunset." Planters said that during the harvest season, the rapid cutting and processing of cane required 20-hour days. Enslaved people working on plantations ultimately had minimal opportunities to claim any of these rights. Most coartados during this time were urban enslaved people.

Gendered slavery

Cuban patriarchy provided a framework for projecting gender roles onto enslaved peoples. Just as the practice of machismo solidified male domination over others, the practice of marianismo elevated the position of white women over enslaved peoples. Machismo and marianismo functioned symbiotically: the white Cuban male was expected to express dominance in public spaces and ventures like the slave trade, while white women exercised control of private spaces (including those staffed by enslaved people) through feminine virtues like motherhood, modesty, and honor.

Cuba's slavery system was gendered in that some labor was performed only by men, and some only by women. Enslaved women in the city of Havana, from the sixteenth century onwards, performed duties such as operating the town taverns, eating houses, and lodges, as well as working as laundresses and domestic laborers. Enslaved women were also forced to serve as sex slaves in the towns.

Though gender roles were predominant in enslaved peoples' labor, historical narratives have been interpreted in gendered ways that highlight the role of men in the resistance to slavery, while occluding the role of enslaved women. Further studies show that the relationship between gender and slave revolt was complex. For instance, historical interpretations of the La Escalera conspiracy reveal the role of machismo in Cuban historiography: 

As December 1843 drew to a close, an enslaved woman in the Sabanilla district named Polonia Gangá shocked her master with the information that his prized sugar property was about to be engulfed in open rebellion… But commencing the story of 1844 at the moment of Polonia’s declaration also necessarily equates a woman’s betrayal.

A machismo historical perspective frames betrayal as one of the only possibilities for enslaved women's participation in insurrection, because it associates rebellion exclusively to masculine aggression. But despite enslaved women being viewed through this limiting lens, these women were known to have played a key role both in armed rebellion against slavery and in more subtle forms of resistance. One such leader was an enslaved woman named Carlota, who led a rebellion in the Triunvirate plantation in Matanzas in 1843. She is considered a pioneer in the Cuban fight against slavery. 

Enslaved women also practised methods of resistance that did not involve armed rebellion. Cuban oral histories and newspaper advertisements indicate a contingent of formerly enslaved women who escaped from their owners. And as in other Latin cultures, racial segregation was not strictly enforced between white men and the mulatta population in Cuba, so some enslaved Cuban women thus gained their freedom through familial and sexual relationships with white men. Men who took enslaved women as wives or concubines sometimes freed both them and their children. Free mixed-race people thus eventually began to constitute an additional Cuban social class in a stature beneath ethnic Europeans and above enslaved Africans. Both freedmen and free people of color, generally of mixed race, came to represent 20% of the total Cuban population and 41% of the non-white Cuban population. 

However, plantation owners also encouraged Afro-Cuban enslaved women to have children in order to reproduce their enslaved work force and replace people killed by the harsh conditions of slavery. Owners paired strong black men with healthy black women, even if they were immediate relatives, forcing them to have sex and “breed stock” of children. The children could then be sold for about 500 pesos, and also saved owners on the cost of importing additional enslaved people from Africa. Sometimes if the owners did not like the quality of the children, they separated the parents and sent the mother back to working in the fields.

Literary legacy

Slavery left a long-lasting mark on Cuban culture that persists to the present day. Cuban writers such as Nicolás Guillén and Lydia Cabrera participated in the Pan-African Négritude movement of the early 20th century (locally known as negrista or negrismo). Afro-Cuban writers undertook a Hispanophone effort to reclaim Cuban blackness and connections to African culture, while expressing a new sensibility comparable to the Harlem Renaissance in New York City. Guillén, Cabrera, and their contemporaries revisited and tried to make sense of slavery and other crimes against Afro-Cuban people, as well as celebrating the enslaved people who had survived and created their own culture.

Notes

Further reading
 Aimes, Hubert H.S. A History of Slavery in Cuba, 1511 to 1868 (GP Putnam's sons, 1907) online.
 Allahar, Anton L. "Slaves, slave merchants and slave owners in 19th century Cuba." Caribbean Studies (1988): 158-191. online
 Brehony, Margaret. "Irish Migration to Cuba, 1835-1845: Empire, Ethnicity, Slavery." Cuban Studies 39 (2008): 60-84.
Childs, Matt D. 1812 Aponte Rebellion in Cuba and the Struggle against Atlantic Slavery, University of North Carolina Press, 2006, 
 Franklin, Sarah L. Women and slavery in nineteenth-century colonial Cuba (University Rochester Press, 2012).

 de la Fuente, Alejandro (2004). "Slave Law and Claims-Making in Cuba: The Tannenbaum Debate Revisited". Law and History Review. 22#2: 339–369. doi:10.2307/4141649. ISSN 0738-2480
Guillén, Nicolás. “Sugarcane,” in Yoruba from Cuba, Trans. Salvador Ortiz-Carboneres. London: Peepal Tree Pres, 2005. 22–23. 
 Hu‐Dehart, Evelyn. "Chinese coolie labour in Cuba in the nineteenth century: Free labour or neo‐slavery?" Slavery and Abolition 14.1 (1993): 67-86.

 Jennings, Evelyn Powell. "War as the 'Forcing House of Change': State Slavery in Late-Eighteenth-Century Cuba." William and Mary Quarterly 62.3 (2005): 411-440. online
 Jennings, Evelyn Powell. "In the Eye of the Storm: The Spanish Colonial State and African Enslavement in Havana, 1763-90." Historical Reflections/Réflexions historiques (2003): 145-162 online.

 Knight, Franklin W. "Origins of Wealth and the Sugar Revolution in Cuba, 1750-1850." Hispanic American Historical Review 57.2 (1977): 231-253 online.
 Knight, Franklin Willis. Cuban Slave Society on the Eve of Abolition, 1838-1880 (PhD dissertation, University of Wisconsin-Madison, 1969).

Montejo, Esteban. Biography of a Runaway Slave (1966). Ed. Miguel Barnet. Trans. W. Nick Hill. Willimantic, CT: Curbstone, 1994. (First published in Spanish in Cuba, and in English in the UK in 1966)
 Murray, David. "The slave trade, slavery and Cuban independence." Slavery and Abolition 20.3 (1999): 106-126.
 Portuondo, Maria M. "Plantation factories: Science and technology in late-eighteenth-century Cuba." Technology and Culture 44.2 (2003): 231-257. online

 Singleton, Theresa A. "Slavery and spatial dialectics on Cuban coffee plantations." World Archaeology 33.1 (2001): 98-114. online

Comparative and international slavery
 Araújo, Ana Lucia. "Slavery and the Atlantic slave trade in Brazil and Cuba from an Afro-Atlantic perspective." Almanack (2016): 1-5. online
 Bartlett, Christopher. "Britain and the Abolition of Slavery in Puerto Rico and Cuba." Journal of Caribbean History 23.1 (1989): 96+.

 Bergad, Laird W. The comparative histories of slavery in Brazil, Cuba, and the United States (Cambridge University Press, 2007) excerpt.
 Corwin, Arthur F. Spain and the Abolition of Slavery in Cuba, 1817–1886 (U of Texas Press, 2014).
 Curbelo, Silvia Álvarez. "Caribbean siblings: Sisterly affinities and differences between Cuba and Puerto Rico in the nineteenth century." in The Routledge Hispanic Studies Companion to Nineteenth-Century Spain (Routledge, 2020) pp. 4-18 focus on slavery, colonialism, and modernity.
 Horne, Gerald. Race to Revolution: The US and Cuba during Slavery and Jim Crow (NYU Press, 2014).
 Kaye, Anthony E. "The Second Slavery: Modernity in the Nineteenth-Century South and the Atlantic World." Journal of Southern History 75.3 (2009): 627-650. online
 Knight, Franklin W., ed. General History of the Caribbean: Volume III: The Slave Societies of the Caribbean. (London: UNESCO, 1997).
 Marquese, Rafael, Tâmis Parron, and Márcia Berbel. "Slavery and politics: Brazil and Cuba, 1790-1850." (2016). online
 Munford, Clarence J., and Michael Zeuske. "Black slavery, class struggle, fear and revolution in St. Domingue and Cuba, 1785-1795." Journal of Negro History 73.1-4 (1988): 12-32 online.

 Raminelli, Ronald. "Reformers of Slavery: Brazil and Cuba c. 1790 and 1840." Varia Historia 37 (2021): 119-154. online

 Schmidt-Nowara, Christopher. Empire and Antislavery: Spain, Cuba, and Puerto Rico, 1833-1874 (University of Pittsburgh Press, 1999).
 Schmidt‐Nowara, Christopher. "The end of slavery and the end of empire: Slave emancipation in Cuba and Puerto Rico." Slavery and Abolition 21.2 (2000): 188-207.
 Schneider, Elena. "African Slavery and Spanish Empire: Imperial Imaginings and Bourbon Reform in Eighteenth-Century Cuba and Beyond." Journal of Early American History 5.1 (2015): 3-29. online
 Scott, Rebecca J. and Jean M. Hébrard. Freedom Papers: An Atlantic Odyssey in the Age of Emancipation. Cambridge, MA: Harvard UP, 2012. 
 Scott, Rebecca J. Degrees of freedom: Louisiana and Cuba after slavery (Harvard University Press, 2009).
 Sheridan, Richard B. "'Sweet Malefactor': The Social Costs of Slavery and Sugar in Jamaica and Cuba, 1807-54." Economic History Review 29.2 (1976): 236-257. online
 Toplin, Robert Brent, ed. Slavery and race relations in Latin America (Greenwood Press, 1974).

Historiography and memory
 Aching, Gerard. Freedom from Liberation: Slavery, Sentiment, and Literature in Cuba (Indiana University Press, 2015).
 Curry-Machado, Jonathan. "How Cuba burned with the ghosts of British slavery: race, abolition and the Escalera." Slavery & Abolition 25.1 (2004): 71-93. online
 Routon, Kenneth. "Conjuring the past: slavery and the historical imagination in Cuba." American Ethnologist 35.4 (2008): 632-649.

 
Spanish colonial period of Cuba